Dancing Through Life is a public art work by artist Schomer Lichtner. It is installed on the  Riverwalk in Pere Marquette Park in downtown Milwaukee, Wisconsin.

Description
The steel sculpture depicts a ballerina "poised prettily" on a cow. The cow is painted green, purple, blue and yellow, with a black face, white triangular nose and red horns. The ballerina bends one knee to rest on the back of the cow and kicks her other leg overhead. She wears a red and white polka-dotted leotard, white tutu and red ballet slippers. Both arms extend aloft, and she holds a blue fan above her head in one hand. The entire composition incorporates folds and assemblage to create a sense of angularity and dynamism.

Location
Dancing Through Life occupies a prominent location at the southern entrance to Pere Marquette Park. Lichtner collaborated with the Riverwalk District BID to contribute to its RiverSculpture! program by placing the sculpture at this location.

References

2003 sculptures
Outdoor sculptures in Wisconsin
Steel sculptures in Wisconsin
Cattle in art
Dance in art